Flamin' Finger is an arcade redemption game and merchandiser developed by American company Dell Electronics Labs and released by Namco, notable for its retro design and electronic soundtrack.

Gameplay 
The game generates an LED maze behind a touchscreen.  The player must then trace through the maze, using their finger, within the given time limit.  Depending on the player's progress when time is up, arcade tickets or prizes are awarded.  The most important aspect of the game is that the rate the timer ticks down increases as the player gets closer to the goal; anything less than a perfectly executed finish will usually result in losing the game.  The touch screen the arcade cabinet uses has a fair amount of friction between the screen and the finger, making it difficult and physically tiring to move the finger rapidly and accurately.  After an operator-adjustable number of failed attempts, the game will ease up on its difficulty somewhat, allowing the game to be won with less perfection.

Versions 
In addition to the original game which distributes arcade tickets, Namco has also released a "merchandiser" edition which contains prizes behind locked compartments in the arcade cabinet.  Upon the successful completion of a maze, the player may choose a prize from behind one of the compartments.

A "tournament edition" of the game was released which allows up to 8 players to compete.

References

External links
Official Namco Flamin' Finger site
Promotional poster
"Merchandiser" edition poster
Tournament edition poster

Arcade video games
Arcade-only video games
Namco redemption games
Maze games
Merchandisers
2003 video games
Video games developed in the United States